Sélim Khawam was a dealer in Egyptian antiquities and the founder of the firm that became Khawam Brothers.

Early life
Khawam's family were of Syrian Christian origins and moved to Egypt in 1850 when Sélim Khawam started a jewellery shop near the Ramses railway station in Cairo. They later became involved in the antiquities business.

References

External links 
 Khawam Brothers Antiquities.

Syrian emigrants to Egypt
Egyptian businesspeople
Year of birth missing
Year of death missing